The  and the related  and  were railbus types operated by Japanese National Railways (JNR) from 1954 until 1969.

History
Four prototypes entered service on the Kihara Line (present day Isumi Railway Isumi Line) in 1954. In 1957, the KiHa 10000 were reclassified as KiHa 01 and 02, the KiHa 10200 were reclassified as KiHa 03.

The last unit, KiHa 02 10, was withdrawn in 1969.

Preserved examples
 KiHa 03-1: Preserved at the Otaru Museum
 KiHa 02-9: Preserved at the ruins of the Hizen-Ikeno Station as a children's library, scrapped in 1983 however due to massive vandalism.

References

01 series
Japanese National Railways